{{Taxobox
| name = Pachypanchax sp. nov. 'Tsiribihina| image = 
| status = DD | status_system = IUCN3.1
| regnum = Animalia
| phylum = Chordata
| classis = Actinopterygii
| ordo = Cyprinodontiformes
| familia = Aplocheilidae
| genus = Pachypanchax
| species = P. sp. nov. 'Tsiribihina'| binomial = Pachypanchax sp. nov. 'Tsiribihina| binomial_authority = 
| synonyms = 
}}Pachypanchax sp. nov. 'Tsiribihina' is a species of fish in the family Aplocheilidae. It is endemic to Madagascar.  Its natural habitat is rivers.

Sources

Pachypanchax
Freshwater fish of Madagascar
Undescribed vertebrate species
Taxonomy articles created by Polbot
Taxobox binomials not recognized by IUCN